Empress Elisabeth or Empress Elizabeth may refer to:
 Isabella of Portugal (1503–1539), Holy Roman Empress by marriage to Charles V
 Elisabeth Christine of Brunswick-Wolfenbüttel (1691–1750), Holy Roman Empress by marriage to Charles VI
 Elizabeth of Russia (1709–1761), Imperial ruler of Russia from 1741 until her death
 Elizabeth Alexeievna (Louise of Baden) (1779–1826), Empress of Russia by marriage to Alexander I
 Elisabeth of Bavaria (1837–1898), Empress of Austria by her marriage to Franz Joseph I; character in Kenneth MacMillan's ballet Mayerling
 Elizabeth Bowes-Lyon (1900–2002), Empress of India by marriage to George VI of the United Kingdom